Lucidity may refer to:

Lucidity (album), a 2006 album by Delain
Lucidity (festival), a music festival in Southern California
"Lucidity" (song), a 2010 song by Tame Impala
Lucidity (video game), a 2009 puzzle-platform game
Lucidity (web series), a 2010 web series about lucid dreaming
The Lucidity Institute, a lucid dreaming research institute

See also

Lucid (disambiguation)
Lucid dream